Ardakan (also romanized as Ardakān and Artagan) is a city in the Central District of Ardakan County, Yazd province, Iran, and serves as capital of the county. At the 2006 census, its population was 51,349 in 13,730 households. The following census in 2011 counted 56,776 people in 16,198 households. The latest census in 2016 showed a population of 75,271 people in 22,475 households.

Ardakan is the second major city of Yazd Province. It was established in the 12th century in the Zardug region. Ardakan is 60 kilometres away from Yazd, and it has dry weather.

The word Ardakan in Persian means "holy place" or "clean place" (Modern Persian: arda+kan / Middle Persian: arta+gan) and the city has many historical religious attractions such as the Grand Mosque of Ardakan (Masjed-e Jame'), Zire-deh Mosque, Emam-Zadeh Mir Seyyed Mohammad and Tekyeh bazaar.

The most important shrine is Pir-e Sabz Chak Chak. Other shrines include Pir Shah Eshtad Izad, Pir Shah Tashtar Izad, Pir Shah Mehr Izad and Pir Shah Morad.

Ardakan is the birthplace of former Iranian president, Mohammad Khatami. It is also a famous type of carpet found around the world.

Districts
Districts include Zeyn Aldin, Koshkeno, Bazarno, and Jannat Abad.

Further reading

External links
 Farshid Sāmāni, Ardakān, In a Thoughtful Mood (Ardakān, Sar dar Garibān), in Persian, Jadid Online, 16 April 2010.
 Audio slideshow (5 min 31 sec)

References 

Ardakan County

Cities in Yazd Province

Populated places in Yazd Province

Populated places in Ardakan County

Populated places established in the 12th century

Mohammad Khatami